Stephen Francis Gera (born July 26, 1978) is an American sports executive and coach. Prior to coaching for the Browns, he was with the San Diego Chargers. He was a decorated officer with the United States Marine Corps, serving two tours in Iraq.

References

1978 births
Living people
American sports executives and administrators
Cleveland Browns coaches
United States Marine Corps officers
United States Marine Corps personnel of the Iraq War